The 37th Cannes Film Festival was held from 11 to 23 May 1984. The Palme d'Or went to the Paris, Texas by Wim Wenders.

The festival opened with Fort Saganne, directed by Alain Corneau and closed with The Bounty, directed by Roger Donaldson. During this festival, a private group, under the patronage of the festival's authorities held a side event presenting film trailers. A French jury, presided by Saul Bass, awarded its Grand Prize to the trailer for Flashdance.

Juries

Main competition
The following people were appointed as the Jury of the 1984 feature film competition:
Dirk Bogarde (UK) Jury President
Franco Cristaldi (Italy)
Michel Deville (France)
Stanley Donen (USA)
Istvan Dosai (Hungary) (cinematography)
Arne Hestenes (Norway) (journalist)
Isabelle Huppert (France)
Ennio Morricone (Italy)
Jorge Semprún (Spain)
Vadim Yusov (Soviet Union)

Camera d'Or
The following people were appointed as the Jury of the 1984 Camera d'Or:
Mehmet Basutcu (Turkey)
José Luis Guarner (Spain)
Bernard Jubard (France)
Michel Jullien (France)
Samuel Lachize (France) (critic)
Serge Leroy (France)
Fee Vaillant (West Germany)

Official selection

In competition - Feature film
The following feature films competed for the Palme d'Or:

Another Country by Marek Kanievska
Diary for My Children (Napló gyermekeimnek) by Márta Mészáros
The Bounty by Roger Donaldson
Cal by Pat O'Connor
Day Is Longer Than Night (Dges game utenebia) by Lana Gogoberidze
The Element of Crime (Forbrydelsens element) by Lars von Trier
Ghare Baire by Satyajit Ray
Henry IV (Enrico IV) by Marco Bellocchio
Paris, Texas by Wim Wenders
The Pirate (La pirate) by Jacques Doillon
Quilombo by Carlos Diegues
Los santos inocentes by Mario Camus
Success Is the Best Revenge by Jerzy Skolimowski
A Sunday in the Country (Un dimanche à la campagne) by Bertrand Tavernier
This Is My Country (Bayan ko: Kapit sa patalim) by Lino Brocka
Under the Volcano by John Huston
Vigil by Vincent Ward
Voyage to Cythera (Taxidi sta Kythera) by Theodoros Angelopoulos
Where the Green Ants Dream by Werner Herzog

Un Certain Regard
The following films were selected for the competition of Un Certain Regard:

 Abel Gance et son Napoléon by Nelly Kaplan
 Andrei Tarkovsky: A Poet in the Cinema (Un poeta nel Cinema: Andreij Tarkovskij) by Donatella Baglivo
 Feroz by Manuel Gutiérrez Aragón
 De grens by Leon de Winter
 Le jour S... by Jean Pierre Lefebvre
 Khandhar by Mrinal Sen
 Man of Flowers by Paul Cox
 A Man of Principle (Cóndores no entierran todos los días) by Francisco Norden
 Maria's Day (Mária-nap) by Judit Elek
 El Norte by Gregory Nava
 The Road to Bresson (De weg naar Bresson) by Leo De Boer, Jurriën Rood
 Spinning Wheel (Yeoin janhoksa moulleya moulleya) by Doo-yong Lee
 Le tartuffe by Gérard Depardieu
 Where Is Parsifal? by Henri Helman

Films out of competition
The following films were selected to be screened out of competition:

 After the Rehearsal (Efter repetitionen) by Ingmar Bergman
 Beat Street by Stan Lathan
 Broadway Danny Rose by Woody Allen
 Choose Me by Alan Rudolph
 Fort Saganne by Alain Corneau
 Once Upon a Time in America by Sergio Leone

Short film competition
The following short films competed for the Short Film Palme d'Or:

Ajtó by Mária Horváth
Bottom's Dream by John Canemaker
Le Cheval de fer by Gérald Frydman, Pierre Levie
Orpheus and Eurydice by Lesley Keen
Points by Dan Collins
Ett Rum by Mats Olof Olsson
Het Scheppen van een koe by Paul Driessen
Le Spectacle by Gilles Chevallier
Chiri by David Takaichvili
Tip Top by Paul Driessen

Parallel sections

International Critics' Week
The following feature films were screened for the 23rd International Critics' Week (23e Semaine de la Critique):

 Argie by Jorge Blanco (Argentina)
 Bless Their Little Hearts by Billy Woodberry (United States)
 Beyond Sorrow, Beyond Pain (Smärtgränsen) by Agneta Elers-Jarleman (Sweden)
 Boy Meets girl by Léos Carax (France)
 Dreams of the City (Ahlam el Madina) by Mohammed Malas (Syria)
 Etienne, le roi (István, a király) by Gábor Koltay (Hungary)
 White Trash (Kanakerbraut) by Uwe Schrader (West Germany)

Directors' Fortnight
The following films were screened for the 1984 Directors' Fortnight (Quinzaine des Réalizateurs):

 Atomstodin by Thorsteinn Jonsson
 The Bostonians by James Ivory
 Epílogo by Gonzalo Suarez
 Die Erben by Walter Bannert
 Everlasting Love by Michael Mak
 Ezkimo Asszony Fazik by Janos Xantus
 Flight to Berlin by Christopher Petit
 The Hit by Stephen Frears
 The House of Water (La casa de agua) by Jacobo Penzo
 Memoirs of Prison (Memórias do Cárcere) by Nelson Pereira dos Santos
 Nunca Fomos Tao Felizes by Murilo Salles
 Old Enough by Marisa Silver
 Orinoko – Nuevo Mundo by Diego Risquez
 Raffl by Christian Berger
 Revanche by Nicholas Vergitsis
 Sista Leken by Jon Lindstrom
 Stranger Than Paradise by Jim Jarmusch
 Variety by Bette Gordon
 The Years of Dreams and Revolt (Les Années de rêves) by Jean-Claude Labrecque

Awards

Official awards
The following films and people received the 1984 Official selection awards:
Palme d'Or: Paris, Texas by Wim Wenders
Grand Prix: Napló gyermekeimnek by Márta Mészáros
Best Director: Bertrand Tavernier for Un dimanche à la campagne
Best Screenplay: Theodoros Angelopoulos, Tonino Guerra and Thanassis Valtinos for Taxidi stin Kythera
Best Actress: Helen Mirren for Cal
Best Actor: Alfredo Landa and for Francisco Rabal Los santos inocentes (Ex aequo)
Best Artistic Contribution: Peter Biziou (cinematographer) for Another Country
Golden Camera
Caméra d'Or: Stranger Than Paradise by Jim Jarmusch
Short films
Short Film Palme d'Or: Le Cheval de fer by Gérald Frydman and Pierre Levie
 Premier Prix: Tchouma by David Takaichvili

Independent awards
FIPRESCI Prizes
Memoirs of Prison (Memórias do Cárcere) by Nelson Pereira dos Santos (Directors' Fortnight)
Paris, Texas by Wim Wenders (In competition)
Voyage to Cythera (Taxidi sta Kythera) by Theodoros Angelopoulos (In competition)
Commission Supérieure Technique
 Technical Grand Prize: Forbrydelsens element by Lars von Trier
Ecumenical Jury
 Prize of the Ecumenical Jury: Paris, Texas by Wim Wenders
 Ecumenical Jury - Special Mention: Los santos inocentes by Mario Camus
Award of the Youth
Foreign Film: Epílogo by Gonzalo Suárez
French Film: Boy Meets Girl by Leos Carax

References

Media
 INA: List of winners of the 1984 festival (commentary in French)

External links 
1984 Cannes Film Festival (web.archive)
Official website Retrospective 1984
Cannes Film Festival Awards for 1984 at Internet Movie Database

Cannes Film Festival
Cannes Film Festival
Cannes Film Festival
Cannes